The Viti Levu snipe (Coenocorypha miratropica) is an extinct species of austral snipe endemic to Fiji. A species of the mostly New Zealand genus Coenocorypha, it became extinct after the arrival of humans in Fiji.

References

Coenocorypha
Holocene extinctions
Birds described in 2003
Extinct birds of Oceania
Taxa named by Trevor H. Worthy